The 2014 Georgetown Hoyas football team represented Georgetown University in the 2014 NCAA Division I FCS football season. They were led by first-year head coach Rob Sgarlata and played their home games at Multi-Sport Field. They were a member of the Patriot League. They finished the season 3–8, 1–5 in Patriot League play to finish in last place.

Schedule

References

Georgetown
Georgetown Hoyas football seasons
Georgetown Hoyas football